Aman Kadyan (born 7 December 1999) is an India Taekwondo athlete. He is currently World Rank 18th in the W-54 kg in Russian Open 2021. He has represented India at various national and international events. Aman Kumar Kadyan told in an interview to Khabar Satta news website that his dream is to represent India in the Olympics and bring gold medal in Taekwondo.

References 

Living people
Indian male taekwondo practitioners
1999 births